Omar Fraile Matarranza (born 17 July 1990) is a Spanish racing cyclist, who currently rides for UCI WorldTeam . He is a winner of stages in the Tour de France and the Giro d'Italia, and has twice won the Mountains classification in the Vuelta a España.

Career

Caja Rural (2013–2015) 
He rode at the 2014 UCI Road World Championships. On 26 April 2015, Fraile won the Giro dell'Appennino from a small group of riders, outsprinting Stefano Pirazzi and Damiano Cunego. The victory at Giro dell'Appennino was Omar's first professional victory. Later that year, Fraile won Stage 4 at the 4 Jours de Dunkerque. He rode in the 2015 Vuelta a España where he won the mountains classification, by making well-timed breakaways in order to gain points for the classification.

Team Dimension Data (2016–2017)

2016 
Subsequently,  announced that Fraile would join them for the 2016 season. He was named in the start list for the 2016 Giro d'Italia, but abandoned the race on Stage 5. However, before abandoning, Fraile managed to wear the Mountains Jersey on stage 3 after collecting enough points on stage 2. Fraile then won the Mountains classification at the Vuelta a Burgos. He then rode the Vuelta a España where he won the Mountains classification once again.

2017 
One week before riding the Giro d'Italia, Fraile finished 2nd on the final stage of the Tour de Yorkshire, and therefore 2nd in the general classification. On stage 11 of the Giro d'Italia, Fraile made the breakaway and ended up winning the stage in a sprint between his breakaway companions. He also managed to pick up points for the Mountains classification which made him wear the Mountains Jersey for 2 days, after eventually losing it later in the race.

Astana (2018–2021)

2018 
At the Paris-Nice, Fraile finished 2nd on the final stage behind David de la Cruz in the sprint. However a month later he took revenge by winning stage 5 at the Tour of the Basque Country. At the end of April, Fraile won the bunch sprint on stage 1 at the Tour de Romandie. Fraile finished 3rd at Spanish National Road Race Championships.

In July 2018, he was named in the start list for the 2018 Tour de France. He went on to win stage 14 of the race. Fraile was placed 57th on the final general classification of the Tour de France 2018.

On 4 August 2018, Fraile competed in Clásica de San Sebastián and was placed 24th; 52 seconds behind winner Julian Alaphilippe.

Major results 

2011
 3rd Time trial, National Under-23 Road Championships
2013
 10th Grand Prix de Plumelec-Morbihan
2015
 1st Giro dell'Appennino
 Vuelta a España
1st  Mountains classification
 Combativity award Stages 3 & 9
 1st  Mountains classification, Tour of the Basque Country
 1st Stage 4 Four Days of Dunkirk
 4th Classic Loire Atlantique
 10th Overall Vuelta a Asturias
2016
 Vuelta a España
1st  Mountains classification
 Combativity award Stage 6
 1st  Mountains classification, Vuelta a Burgos
 7th Gran Premio di Lugano
 Giro d'Italia
Held  after Stage 2
2017
 Giro d'Italia
1st Stage 11
Held  after Stages 12–13
 2nd Overall Tour de Yorkshire
  Combativity award Stage 12 Vuelta a España
2018
 1st Stage 14 Tour de France
 1st Stage 1 Tour de Romandie
 1st Stage 5 Tour of the Basque Country
 3rd Road race, National Road Championships
  Combativity award Stage 17 Vuelta a España
2019
 1st Stage 1 (TTT) Vuelta a España
 5th Overall Vuelta a Murcia
2020
 1st  Mountains classification, Vuelta a Murcia
2021
 1st  Road race, National Road Championships
 9th GP Miguel Induráin
2022
 3rd Overall Tour of Britain
 10th Overall CRO Race
2023
 1st Stage 5 Vuelta a Andalucía

Grand Tour general classification results timeline

References

External links 

 
 

1990 births
Living people
Cyclists from the Basque Country (autonomous community)
Spanish male cyclists
Sportspeople from Biscay
Spanish Giro d'Italia stage winners
Spanish Tour de France stage winners
People from Santurtzi
Olympic cyclists of Spain
Cyclists at the 2020 Summer Olympics